Lach Dennis is a civil parish and village in the unitary authority of Cheshire West and Chester and the ceremonial county of Cheshire, England. The civil parish population at the 2011 census was 232.

History 
Lach Dennis was included as a land to Vale Royal Abbey by Edward I. Abbot Walter exchanged the estates with Randle de Merton for Merton, so early as the reign of Edward VI. The Shakerleys had property here, as had also the Venables of Antrobus. The resident proprietors are the executors of the late Cranage Antrobus,  Alfred Low, Esq.,  Mr Jonathan Butters,  and Mr France.

Geography 

See also

Listed buildings in Lach Dennis

References

External links

Villages in Cheshire
Civil parishes in Cheshire